Christina Kokoviadou (born 14 May 1994) is a Greek football midfielder.

External links 
 

1994 births
Living people
Women's association football midfielders
Greek women's footballers
Greece women's international footballers
21st-century Greek women